Sacking by Russian forces during the 2022 Russian invasion of Ukraine is the mass cases of robberies and thefts committed by the Russian military in the occupied territories of Ukraine recorded by international observers and local residents.  Since the beginning of February, the media have been publishing eyewitness accounts of military operations in Ukraine about massive cases of looting by soldiers of the Russian army.  International organizations such as Human Rights Watch, as well as Ukrainian, European and Russian independent media and NGOs document and investigate cases of looting and transportation of stolen personal items and industrial equipment to the territory of Russia and Belarus.

History 
On the third day of the invasion of Konotop, food stores were looted, there was a video on the Internet in which Russian soldiers took out a safe from a bank branch in the Kherson region.

In March, farmers from Kherson, Cherkasy and Kyiv regions testified that their cars and products were taken from them.  From the outskirts of captured Melitopol, 27 John Deere agricultural vehicles were stolen - tractors, seeders, combines - each of which costs at least 300 thousand US dollars.  Since all the equipment is equipped with GPS navigation systems, the owners managed to track its movement - at the end of April, the cars ended up in the Chechenya village of Zakan-Yurt, however, inoperative, since the anti-theft system allows for remote blocking.  According to CNN, Russian military trucks transport wheat to Crimea from Zaporozhye warehouses and Melitopol.

In early June, The Washington Post, citing the head of the State Agency of Ukraine for the management of the exclusion zone, Yevgeny Kramarenko, reported that the Russian military caused damage to the Chernobyl nuclear power plant that cost Ukraine an amount of more than 135 million US dollars.  698 computers, 344 cars, 1500 dosimeters were stolen or destroyed, as well as almost all fire fighting equipment needed to fight forest fires in the exclusion zone. Part of the equipment, according to GPS sensors, was located on the territory of Belarus.

After returning to their homes, residents of the village of Novy Bykov, Chernihiv region, found that their apartments were looted, household appliances, women's perfumes, electronics, and upholstered furniture were stolen. Residents who remained in the village during the days of the occupation saw how things were loaded into the Ural army trucks. Computers and projectors disappeared from the village school. It was also reported about the looting of the village of Stary Bykov.  Mass robberies were recorded in Irpin. One of the local families told The Guardian that all clothes and shoes were stolen from their house, including women's underwear and dresses.  Citizens testify that cash, jewelry and simple household items were stolen from their homes, provided by residents of the villages of Grebelki, Velyka Dymerka, Vilkhivki.  Human Rights Watch staff also documented Ukrainian testimonies of robberies, for example, in the city of Dymer, Kyiv region.  Shaun Walker, a journalist of The Guardian, received numerous testimonies from local residents in the city of Trostyanets about the facts of murders and robberies committed during the period of control of the city by Russian troops. For example, the owner of a beauty salon, Daria Sasina, said that her salon was looted, taking all cosmetics, furniture and paintings from the walls.  A resident of the Chernihiv region in an interview said that during the retreat, Russian soldiers took the toilet bowl from her house.  

The Ukrainian news published recordings of "interceptions" of telephone conversations between Russian soldiers and their families, in which thefts from shops and abandoned apartments are discussed. On one of the recordings, the soldier says that his colleagues “drag bags” of the loot, on the other, he receives a list of things that he is asked to bring. The media note that it is impossible to establish the authenticity of the recordings in wartime, but territorially they coincide with the zones that were under Russian occupation.

According to the Minister of Defense of Ukraine, a market was opened in the Belarusian city of Narovlya for the sale of things stolen in Ukraine: motorcycles and bicycles, household appliances, toys, furniture, carpets, etc. are sold there. Columns of trucks in the direction of Narovlya are moving from Buryn.  Also, data on the movement of devices testified to robberies - this option is available for most Apple gadgets and accessories. Their Ukrainian owners saw by geolocation that things from their apartments were in Russia.  In other cases, geolocation of the stolen AirPods was used to track the movement of Russian army units.  On April 18, 2022, on the VKontakte social network, user Yuri Zverev posted a question on how to legalize a BMW SUV brought to the Tver region from Ukraine. On April 20, the group was blocked at the request of the Prosecutor General's Office of the Russian Federation. Later, denials appeared on the Internet from members of the Zverev family, who claimed that his account was hacked and the message was not posted by him.

On May 1, the Ukrainian Ministry of Defense claimed that ventilators and other equipment provided since 2014 by international donors and the government of Ukraine had been removed from a hospital in Starobilsk.

In May 2022, a refugee from Ukraine, Alina Koreynyuk, identified her property in a photograph circulating on the Internet with a tank filmed in the Popasna area and loaded with civilian belongings. According to Koreynyuk, the photo was taken five minutes away from her house, and on the tank were the recently bought children's sheets with Disney prints, a blanket and tablecloth from a country house, a sealed heating tank, which she recently bought and did not have time to install in the apartment.

Journalistic investigations 
The Mediazona project published an investigation in which it tracked an unusual surge in the growth of parcels from the cities of Armyansk, Boguchar, Valuyka, Dzhankoy, Zheleznogorsk, Klimovo, Klintsy, Mozyr, Novozybkov, Pokrovskoe, Rossosh, Rylskv and Unecha to Russia through the delivery service SDEK coinciding with the start of the war. According to the publication, in three months the military could redirect 58 tons of things in this way. Numerous footage from surveillance cameras inside delivery points, in which people in military uniform brought backpacks with things into the departments and wrapped them in packaging film, got onto the Internet. The largest number of parcels was sent to the Russian cities of Rubtsovsk, Yurga, Chebarkul, Miass, Kyzyl, Chita, Biysk and Borzya.  On April 29, 2022, a video was published in which a Russian officer allegedly sent the Orlan-10 drone, which is in service with the Russian army, from the SDEK point in Valuyki.  The Belarusian Gayun reported that Russian soldiers bought a lot of goods in the shops of the Belarusian Mozyr and also sent them to Russia also with the help of the SDEK service, but this can it only explainws part of the parcels.  Against the backdrop of the scandal that arose, SDEK turned off broadcasts from its branches located on the border with Ukraine.

Criminal prosecution 
On June 2, the Ukrainian police announced that they had opened criminal cases of looting against ten Russian soldiers from the National Guard unit No. 6720 stationed in Rubtsovsk. The article assumes up to 12 years in prison.

Russian statements 
Representatives of the Russian Foreign Ministry have repeatedly accused the Ukrainian side of filming staged videos with footage of looting by Russian soldiers.

See also 

 2022 Russian theft of Ukrainian grain
 Art theft and looting by Russia during the invasion of Ukraine
 Ukrainian cultural heritage during the 2022 Russian invasion

References 

Russian war crimes in Ukraine
2022 Russian invasion of Ukraine
War crimes in Ukraine
Looting in Europe